Delta3-cis-Delta2-trans-enoyl-CoA isomerase may refer to:
 Dodecenoyl-CoA isomerase, an enzyme
 Vinylacetyl-CoA Delta-isomerase, an enzyme